Maple Leaf Creek is located in McMillan Township of Michigan's Ontonagon County in the Upper Peninsula.  The creek has its origin in Section 17 of the township, and winds its way through Sections 16 and 15, flowing into the South Branch Ontonagon River, about 1 miles north of the community of Ewen.

References
"Mapbook of Michigan Counties." TwoPeninsula Press, Michigan Natural Resources Magazine, 1984 edition

Rivers of Ontonagon County, Michigan
Rivers of Michigan
Tributaries of Lake Superior